Alexander Andreyevich Grigoryev (in , October 4, 1949 – December 10, 2008) was a Russian security services official.

Grigoryev was born in Leningrad.

In 1975–2001 he served in the KGB and its successors. As a KGB officer he also took part in Soviet–Afghan War. From August 28 till October 1, 1998, he led the Economic Security Department of FSB. From October 1, 1998, till January 5, 2001, he was the Chief of the FSB Directorate of Saint Petersburg and Leningrad Oblast and Deputy Director of FSB. In January–July 2001 he was an adviser to FSB Director Nikolai Patrushev. Since July 19, 2001, he has been the Director General of the State Reserves Agency (Gosrezerv).

References

KGB officers
Soviet military personnel of the Soviet–Afghan War
Russian politicians
1st class Active State Councillors of the Russian Federation
1949 births
2008 deaths
Burials at Serafimovskoe Cemetery